Baryssiniella tavakiliani is a species of longhorn beetles of the subfamily Lamiinae. It was described by Berkov and Monne in 2010, and is known from French Guiana.

References

;  2010: A new species of Neobaryssinus Monné & Martins, and two new species of Baryssiniella new genus (Coleoptera: Cerambycidae), reared from trees in the Brazil nut family (Lecythidaceae). Zootaxa, 2538: 47–59. Preview PDF

Beetles described in 2010
Endemic fauna of French Guiana
Acanthocinini